Kopilovtsi (Cyrillic: Копиловци) may refer to the following places in Bulgaria:

 Kopilovtsi, Kyustendil Province, a village in Kyustendil municipality
 Kopilovtsi, Montana Province, a village in Georgi Damyanovo municipality